The 1934 Lowestoft by-election was an election held for the House of Commons of the United Kingdom's constituency of Lowestoft, it was the first ever by election in the constituency. It was held on Thursday 15 February 1934, polling stations opened between the hours of 8 am and 10 pm.

Vacancy
The Conservative Party Member of Parliament (MP) Sir Gervais Rentoul resigned upon appointment as a Metropolitan Police Court Magistrate.

Last result

Candidates
The candidates selected for the by election, were as follows Pierse Loftus who stood on behalf of the Conservative Party, Reginald Sorensen was selected on behalf of the Labour Party. William Smith a local Alderman and Justice of the Peace, stood for the Liberal Party. Some records describe Smith as an 'Independent Liberal', a term that was often used at this time to describe the official Liberal Party that was led by Sir Herbert Samuel, who opposed the National Government. However, there should be no doubt that Smith was an official Liberal candidate and was claimed as such in The Liberal Party Yearbook at the time.

Campaign
In the weeks and months leading up to the by election several meetings took place, the Labour Party's meetings focussed on the towns fishing industry, an advert appeared in the Lowestoft Journal of 1934 stating that a meeting would take place at the towns hippodrome on Sunday 4 February 1934 at 7.30 pm. Guest speakers included the Rt Hon. Ted Kennedy, Noel Palmer and the Labour Party candidate himself.

The Conservative Party also decided to focus their campaign on the local fishing industry and Loftus conducted many meetings, in the run up to the election, this included one with the Southwold's women unionists. Loftus also conducted a constituency meeting on the Claremont Pier pavilion, where he was joined by speakers Geoff Shakespeare, a Liberal National MP for Norwich. The constituency meeting was described in a local paper as "full and lively".

Whereas William Smith the Liberal decided to concentrate his campaign on unemployment, this included unemployment at a national and a local level.

Result

The Liberal vote was substantially down from its 1929 level. William Smith forfeited his deposit under Section 27 of the Representation of the People Act 1918.

See also
Gervais Rentoul

References 

1934 elections in the United Kingdom
Lowestoft
1934 in England
Lowestoft
February 1934 events